Sherry Tsai (born 4 September 1983) is a retired swimmer from Hong Kong. She competed at the 2000, 2004 and 2008 Olympics in the 50 m freestyle, 100 m and 200 m backstroke, and 200 m individual medley (six events in total), with the best achievement of 28th place. She attended and swam for the University of California, Berkeley in the USA.

She won Hong Kong's Best Swimmer Award 4 years-in-a-row (1998–2001), and at one time held 14 Hong Kong Records. At the 2004 Olympics, she was Hong Kong's flagbearer for the Opening Ceremony.

She has swum for Hong Kong at:
Olympics: 2000, 2004, 2008
World Championships: 1998, 2003, 2007, 2009
Asian Games: 1998, 2002, 2006
Asian Indoor Games: 2007, 2009
Asian Swimming Championships: 2009
East Asian Games: 2001, 2009
World University Games: 2003, 2005

References

1983 births
Living people
Hong Kong female medley swimmers
Olympic swimmers of Hong Kong
Swimmers at the 2000 Summer Olympics
Swimmers at the 2004 Summer Olympics
Swimmers at the 2008 Summer Olympics
Swimmers at the 1998 Asian Games
Swimmers at the 2002 Asian Games
Swimmers at the 2006 Asian Games
Asian Games medalists in swimming
Hong Kong female freestyle swimmers
Hong Kong female backstroke swimmers
Medalists at the 2006 Asian Games
Asian Games bronze medalists for Hong Kong
21st-century Hong Kong women